The 1 November 1954 Stadium is a multi-use stadium in Tizi Ouzou, Algeria.  It is used mostly for football matches and is the home ground of JS Kabylie. The stadium holds 25,000 people. 

The stadium is named for the date of the founding of the National Liberation Front, which obtained independence for Algeria from France.

In 2014 following the death of footballer Albert Ebossé Bodjongo, the Algerian Football Federation suspended all football indefinitely and ordered the closure of the stadium.

References

External links
Stadium file - goalzz.com

1er Novembre
Buildings and structures in Tizi Ouzou Province